The 1963 All-Big Eight Conference football team consists of American football players chosen by various organizations for All-Big Eight Conference teams for the 1963 NCAA University Division football season.  The selectors for the 1963 season included the Associated Press (AP) and the United Press International (UPI).  Players selected as first-team players by both the AP and UPI are designated in bold.

All-Big Eight selections

Backs
 Gale Sayers, Kansas (AP-1; UPI-1 [HB]) (College and Pro Football Halls of Fame)
 Tom Vaughn, Iowa State (AP-1; UPI-1 [HB])
 Jim Grisham, Oklahoma (AP-1; UPI-1 [FB])
 Dennis Claridge, Nebraska (AP-1)
 Gary Lane, Missouri (UPI-1 [QB])

Ends
 George Seals, Missouri (AP-1; UPI-1)
 Mike Shinn, Kansas (AP-1)
 John Flynn, Oklahoma (UPI-1)

Tackles
 Ralph Neely, Oklahoma (AP-1; UPI-1)
 Lloyd Voss, Nebraska (AP-1; UPI-1)

Guards
 Bob Brown, Nebraska (AP-1; UPI-1) (College and Pro Football Halls of Fame)
 Newt Burton, Oklahoma (AP-1; UPI-1)

Centers
 John Berrington, Iowa State (AP-1)
 Pete Quatrochi, Kansas (UPI-1)

Key
AP = Associated Press

UPI = United Press International

See also
 1963 College Football All-America Team

References

All-Big Seven Conference football team
All-Big Eight Conference football teams